An ileosigmoid knot is a form of volvulus in which ileum wraps around the base of the sigmoid and passes beneath itself forming a knot.

The exact cause of this condition is not known. Patients usually present with clinical features of colonic obstruction. Vomiting, abdominal distension, abdominal pain, blood stained stools are frequent symptoms. It is difficult to diagnose this condition before surgery. Raveenthiran described a triad which may be useful in preoperative diagnosis. The triad includes 1). Clinical features suggestive of small bowel obstruction, 2). Radiological features suggestive of large bowel obstruction, 3). Inability to negotiate sigmoidoscope or a flatus tube. This is a surgical emergency that requires urgent resection of gangrenous bowel and untwisting of the volvulus.

References
 

Gastrointestinal tract disorders